Khin Pyezon (also spelled Hkinpyison) was a minor queen of King Bayinnaung of Toungoo Dynasty. She was the mother of King Nyaungyan (r. 1599–1605).

References

Bibliography
 
 

Queens consort of Toungoo dynasty
16th-century Burmese women